Ptyongnathosia cotopaxiana is a species of moth of the family Tortricidae. It is found in Cotopaxi Province, Ecuador.

The wingspan is about 16.5 mm. The ground colour of the forewings is cream with brownish-grey admixture. It is sprinkled and in part suffused with brownish grey and dotted with blackish. The hindwings are creamish, dotted with grey.

Etymology
The species name refers to the province of Cotopaxi.

References

Moths described in 2008
Euliini